The Cnephasiini are a tribe of tortrix moths.

Genera
Amphicoecia
Archicnephasia
Arotrophora
Astrosa
Cnephasia
Decodes
Decodina
Doloploca
Drachmobola
Eana
Epicnephasia
Exapate
Hypostephanuncia
Immariana
Kawabeia
Mictoneura
Neosphaleroptera
Oporopsamma
Oxypteron
Paranepsia
Propiromorpha
Protopterna
Pseudargyrotoza
Sphaleroptera – may belong in Cnephasia
Stenopteron
Taeniarchis
Tortricodes
Xerocnephasia

Former genera
Anoplocnephasia
Brachycnephasia
Sciaphila
Synochoneura

References

 , 2005: World catalogue of insects volume 5 Tortricidae.
 , 1962: Anopina, a new genus of the Cnephasiini from the New World (Lepidoptera, Tortricidae). American Museum Novitates 2082: 1-39. Full article: .
  1965: Palaearctic Cnephasiini. Acta zoologica cracoviensia 15(8): 341-399.
 , 2011: Faunistic data of several significant tortricid species from Spain with descriptions of four new species (Lepidoptera: Tortricidae). Shilap Revista de Lepidopterologia 39 (154): 141-153.
Journal of Natural History 2014: 1-40. Full article: 

 
Moth tribes
Taxa named by Henry Tibbats Stainton